Ruben Bemelmans (born 14 January 1988) is a Belgian former professional tennis player. He has a career-high ATP ranking of world No. 84 in singles, achieved on 28 September 2015, and world No. 128 in doubles, achieved on 1 October 2012. Bemelmans competed mainly in the Challenger tour circuit.

Tennis career

2006–2009: Turned Pro
Bemelmans won his first Futures event in Espelkamp, Germany in July 2007. His best performance to date was in winning the Volkswagen Challenger event in Wolfsburg in March 2009, winning three matches in qualifying before going on to beat Stefano Galvani of Italy in the final. He won this tournament again in 2011.

2010–2014: ATP and Grand Slam debut, Hopman Cup finalist
In February 2010 Bemelmans succeeded in qualifying for his first ATP level event, the Zagreb Indoors tournament. However he lost in the first round to Alexandre Sidorenko of France in three sets.

In June 2010, he entered the main draw of the 2010 Gerry Weber Open in Halle as a lucky loser. In the opening round he lost to German Philipp Kohlschreiber in three close sets.

In September 2010, Ruben played for Belgium in the Davis cup play-off tie against Australia. He was a late replacement for an injured Steve Darcis. He played Lleyton Hewitt and after a solid effort, he succumbed in a 6–7, 5–7, 6–2, 4–6 duel.

In January 2011, Bemelmans was invited to represent Belgium in the Hopman Cup alongside Justine Henin. They reached the final, beating Kazakhstan and Serbia along the way, where they were defeated by USA 2–1.

Bemelmans won his first match in a Grand Slam main draw at 2012 Wimbledon, defeating Carlos Berlocq in 4 sets. He was bested by Richard Gasquet in straight sets in the second round. About a month later, Bemelmans (playing doubles with fellow countryman Xavier Malisse) won his first title on the ATP Tour, the 250 level Los Angeles Open.

In 2013, Bemelmans made the final of 2 Challenger Tour events, Nottingham (a Challenger event from 2011–2014) and Eckental where he lost to Steve Johnson and Benjamin Becker respectively. As a qualifier, Bemelmans reached the quarterfinals of Vienna in 2013, defeating No. 4 seed Philipp Kohlschreiber en route.

2014 saw Bemelmans have another strong showing at Eckental, this time winning the tournament, beating 2012 champion Daniel Brands en route.

2015–2018: US Open and Wimbledon third rounds

In September 2015, Bemelmans defeated Gilles Müller and Jack Sock (retired) to reach the third round of the US Open where he lost against Switzerland's Stan Wawrinka in three sets. 

He was unable to defend his title in Eckental however, falling in the semi-finals to Benjamin Becker. Bemelmans also played an active part in the Belgian Davis Cup team that reached the final that season, and played the second singles rubber where he was beaten by Andy Murray.

Bemelmans made 2 Challenger finals late in 2016, at Charlottesville and Champaign.

In 2017, Bemelmans won the title in Koblenz, which pushed him back inside the Top 150, before losing to Denis Shapovalov in the final of the Challenger in Drummondville. 

He then made the third round of Wimbledon, his best result at the tournament, beating former world No. 2 Tommy Haas in the first round.

The 2018 Australian Open saw Bemelmans win his first match at the tournament in 3 main draw appearances when he earned a credible first round victory over 18th seed Lucas Pouille.

At the 2018 French Open he made it past the first round for the second consecutive grand slam when he beat Yuki Bhambri in his opening match. However he lost in five sets in round two to Estonian Jürgen Zopp.

Bemelmans qualified for the 2018 Wimbledon Championships defeating Bernard Tomic in the final qualifying round. He then defeated American Steve Johnson in five sets to reach round 2 of a slam for the third consecutive time in 2018.

2019–2022: Retirement
He made history when he qualified for an Open Era record sixth time at the 2019 Wimbledon Championships beating American Donald Young 6-4, 6-4, 6-1. Bemelmans had been tied for the qualifying record with Alejandro Falla, Ken Flach, Edouard Roger-Vasselin and Jimmy Wang.

In February 2021, He won his sixth singles Challenger title at the 2021 Challenger La Manche defeating Lukáš Rosol. In September, he also won his tenth doubles Challenger title at the 2021 Challenger Biel/Bienne partnering Daniel Masur.

He played his last singles professional match in the qualifying draw as a wildcard at the Antwerp Open. He also participated in the doubles event having received also a wildcard partnering compatriot Alexander Blockx where he lost in the first round.

ATP career finals

Doubles: 1 (1 title)

Team competition finals

Challenger and Futures finals

Singles: 37 (20–17)

Doubles: 40 (27–13)

Singles performance timeline

Best Grand Slam results details

References

External links

 
 
 
 

1988 births
Living people
Belgian male tennis players
Flemish sportspeople
Hopman Cup competitors
Sportspeople from Genk